Palpita venatalis is a moth in the family Crambidae. It is found in Guatemala, Costa Rica and Panama.

References

Moths described in 1920
Palpita
Moths of Central America